The SMS Möwe (Seagull) was a gunboat of the Imperial German Navy.

Service history
The Möwe was built by F. Schichau in Elbing and launched in 1879. It was deployed on service mostly at overseas stations, most notably in German West Africa. 

On 28 October 1880, Möwe was driven into the British schooner Rescue at Plymouth, Devon, United Kingdom. The schooner was severely damaged at the bow. Möwe lost her bowsprit and topsail yard. In 1882, anti-European unrest following the British bombardment of Alexandria prompted the German government to send the Möwe and the Habicht to rescue German and Austrian nationals in Egypt, taking around 150 of them from Ismailiya to Port Said.

The Möwe was the vessel which took the Imperial Commissioner for West Africa, Gustav Nachtigal, out to seek treaties of protection with local rulers in 1884. On 4 July 1884 the first such treaty was signed at Bagida on the Togo coast, which thereby became a German colony. On 14 July 1884 Nachtigal took the Möwe to Bell-town (Douala) and signed a similar treaty, making Kamerun another colony of the German Empire. After this the Möwe brought the German flag to Nigeria, Gabon, and Angola, before taking Nachtigal south to found the new colony of German South West Africa. In 1889 it was involved in the suppression of the Abushiri revolt in German East Africa.

After 1895 it was used as a survey vessel coastal mapping German colonies in the Pacific and in German New Guinea. On 9 December 1905 the Möwe was decommissioned. It was retained as a hulk in the German colony of Tsingtau on the Yellow Sea before finally being sold in 1910.

Technical description
The ship was 52.2m long, 8.9m breit and had a draught of 3.52m and a displacement of 845 tons. It was built using composite materials, with iron Ribs and wooden planks, covered with zinc plates. Two boilers produced the required steam, and a 3-cylinder engine provided 652kW (886PSi) of power to the 3.23m diameter propeller. It could make a top speed of 11.7 knots. With a coal stock of 100 tons and a speed of 11 knots it had an effective range of around 1230 nautical miles. There was no electrical equipment on board. It had a crew of 127. 

The ship was originally barquentine-rigged with a total sail surface of 847m². It as later converted to schooner-rigging with 361m² of sail.

Armament
The ship, also designated as an aviso, was initially equipped with one 15cm hoop gun and four smaller 12cm hoop guns. This armament was replaced in 1882 by five 12.5 cm hoop guns, later reduced to two in 1890. Furthermore, from 1882 there were five 3.7 cm hotchkiss guns on board.

The maximum ammunition stock consisted of 115 rounds of 15 cm shells and 440 rounds of 12 cm shells. After conversion, 620 rounds of 12.5 cm shells could be carried, but from 1890, storage space for only 246 shells of this caliber was provided.

Literature 
 Erich Gröner, Dieter Jung, Martin Maass: Die deutschen Kriegsschiffe 1815–1945, Band 1. Bernard & Graefe, München 1982, .
 Hans H. Hildebrand, Albert Röhr, Hans-Otto Steinmetz: Die deutschen Kriegsschiffe Band 4, 1. Auflage, Herford 1982, S. 126 ff.

References

1879 ships
Ships built in Germany
Naval ships of Germany
German Empire
19th century in Africa
Maritime incidents in October 1880